Dobrogeanu is a Romanian-language surname. Notable people with the surname include:

Eugen Dobrogeanu, Romanian officer
Alexandru Dobrogeanu-Gherea, Romanian communist militant, son of Constantin
Constantin Dobrogeanu-Gherea, Romanian Marxist theorist

Romanian-language surnames
Toponymic surnames
Ethnonymic surnames